Gunilla Ekberg is a Swedish-Canadian lawyer. From 2002 to 2006, she was employed at the Ministry of Industry as the Swedish Government's expert on prostitution and trafficking in human beings.

Education 
Ekberg's education includes a degree in social work from Lund University, and a law degree from the University of British Columbia in Canada. She took out Canadian citizenship in 2003.

Career 
Ekberg is a strong opponent of prostitution, and an outspoken advocate for Sweden's approach to prostitution, in which the sex buyers are prosecuted, but the prostitutes are supported by the social services in an effort to move them out of the industry. In 2005, the program The Gender War criticized Ekberg for telling the reporter Evin Rubar that she could not expect help if she was assaulted, since she opposed the feminist movement.
This led to calls for her resignation, but Equality Minister (Jämställdhetsminister) Jens Orback defended her.

Ekberg later became Co-Executive Director to the lobby group Coalition Against Trafficking in Women International in Brussels, from which she continued to campaign against prostitution around the world, including Bulgaria, Australia, and Vancouver.

Articles 
  Pdf.
 
  Pdf.

See also 
Prostitution in Sweden
CATW

References 

Swedish feminists
Canadian people of Swedish descent
Anti-prostitution feminists
Canadian feminists
Prostitution in Sweden
Living people
Year of birth missing (living people)
Lund University alumni
University of British Columbia alumni
Canadian women lawyers
Peter A. Allard School of Law alumni
Swedish women lawyers
20th-century Swedish lawyers
20th-century Canadian lawyers
21st-century Swedish lawyers
21st-century Canadian lawyers
20th-century women lawyers
21st-century women lawyers
20th-century Canadian women
20th-century Swedish women